General Sir Frederick Francis Maude  (20 December 1821 – 20 June 1897) was a recipient of the Victoria Cross, the highest and most prestigious award for gallantry in the face of the enemy that can be awarded to British and Commonwealth forces.

Personal life
He was born in Lisnadill, County Armagh, son of the Rev Hon John Charles Maude . He married Catherine Mary Bisshopp, daughter of Very Rev. Sir George Bisshopp, 9th Baronet, on 22 February 1853. The couple had five children 
Ada Cecil Maude d. 16 Jul 1886
Alice Emily Maude b. 7 Jun 1855, d. 8 Feb 1936
Frederick Eustace Cecil Maude b. 2 May 1859, d. 17 Feb 1862
Amy Kathleen Maude b. 3 Mar 1863, d. 30 Jul 1937
Lt.-Gen. Sir Frederick Stanley Maude KCB CMG DSO b. 24 Jun 1864, d. 18 Nov 1917

He was also the cousin of Colonel F. C. Maude, VC

Victoria Cross

He was 33 years old, and a brevet lieutenant colonel in the 3rd Regiment of Foot (later The Buffs (East Kent Regiment)), British Army during the Crimean War when the following deed took place for which he was awarded the VC.

On 5 September 1855 at Sebastopol, Crimea, Lieutenant Colonel Maude was in charge of the covering and ladder party of the 2nd Division in the assault on the Redan. He held a position with only nine or ten men and did not retire until all hope of support was at an end and he himself was dangerously wounded.

Later life
Maude served in the Peshawar Field Force and became General Sir Frederick Francis Maude VC GCB.

He died in Torquay, Devon on 20 June 1897 and is buried in Brompton Cemetery, London.

References

The Register of the Victoria Cross (1981, 1988 and 1997)

Ireland's VCs  (Dept of Economic Development, 1995)
Monuments to Courage (David Harvey, 1999)
Irish Winners of the Victoria Cross (Richard Doherty & David Truesdale, 2000)

External links
Location of grave and VC medal (Brompton Cemetery)

1821 births
1897 deaths
19th-century Irish people
Irish soldiers in the British Army
People from County Armagh
Crimean War recipients of the Victoria Cross
Irish recipients of the Victoria Cross
British Army personnel of the Crimean War
British military personnel of the Second Anglo-Afghan War
British Army generals
Knights Grand Cross of the Order of the Bath
Burials at Brompton Cemetery
British Army recipients of the Victoria Cross
Maude family
Military personnel from County Armagh